Psydrax is a genus of flowering plants in the family Rubiaceae. It consists of trees, shrubs, and a few lianas in the paleotropics.

Taxonomy
The genus was named by Joseph Gaertner in 1788 in his book, De Fructibus et Seminibus Plantarum. Psydrax is a Greek word meaning a blister or bump. Gaertner may have chosen this name to refer to the warty fruit or the pimply seeds of some species. The name was hardly ever used after Gaertner proposed it because most authors placed these species in Canthium. Psydrax was reinstated in 1985 and 37 African species were transferred to it from Canthium. The monospecific genus Mesoptera was also sunk into Psydrax. Psydrax was shown to be monophyletic in a molecular phylogenetic study. It is closely related to Afrocanthium, Cyclophyllum and Keetia, genera that have been segregated from Canthium.

Species 

 Psydrax acutiflora (Hiern) Bridson
 Psydrax ammophila S.T.Reynolds & R.J.F.Hend.
 Psydrax amplifolia (Elmer)A.P.Davis
 Psydrax ankotekonensis (Cavaco) A.P.Davis & Bridson
 Psydrax approximatus (Korth.) Mahyuni & K.M.Wong
 Psydrax arnoldiana (De Wild. & T.Durand) Bridson
 Psydrax attenuata (R.Br. ex Benth.) S.T.Reynolds & R.J.F.Hend.
 Psydrax austro-orientalis (Cavaco) A.P.Davis & Bridson
 Psydrax banksii S.T.Reynolds & R.J.F.Hend.
 Psydrax bathieana (Cavaco)A.P.Davis & Bridson
 Psydrax bridsoniana Cheek & Sonké
 Psydrax calcicola (Craib)A.P.Davis
 Psydrax capensis J.C.Manning & Goldblatt
 Psydrax cymigera (Valeton)S.T.Reynolds & R.J.F.Hend.
 Psydrax dicoccos Gaertn.
 Psydrax dunlapii (Hutch. & Dalziel) Bridson
 Psydrax esirensis (Cavaco) A.P.Davis & Bridson
 Psydrax fasciculata (Blume) A.P.Davis
 Psydrax faulknerae Bridson
 Psydrax ficiformis (Hook.f.) Bridson
 Psydrax forsteri S.T.Reynolds & R.J.F.Hend.
 Psydrax fragrantissima (K.Schum.) Bridson
 Psydrax gilletii (De Wild.) Bridson
 Psydrax graciliflora (Merr. & L.M.Perry) S.T.Reynolds & R.J.F.Hend.
 Psydrax grandifolia (Thwaites) Ridsdale
 Psydrax graniticola (Chiov.) Bridson
 Psydrax gynochthodes (Baill.) Arriola, Yayen & Alejandro
 Psydrax horizontalis (SChumach. & Thonn.) Bridson
 Psydrax johnsonii S.T.Reynolds & R.J.F.Hend.
 Psydrax kaessneri (S.Moore) Bridson
 Psydrax kibuwae Bridson
 Psydrax kingii (Hook.f.) Bridson & Springate
 Psydrax kraussioides (Hiern) Bridson
 Psydrax lamprophylla (F.Muell.) Bridson
 Psydrax latifolia (F.Muell. ex Benth.) S.T.Reynolds & R.J.F.Hend.
 Psydrax laxiflorens S.T.Reynolds & R.J.F.Hend.
 Psydrax lepida S.T.Reynolds & R.J.F.Hend.
 Psydrax livida (Hiern) Bridson
 Psydrax locuples (K.Schum.) Bridson
 Psydrax longipes S.T.Reynolds & R.J.F.Hend.
 Psydrax longistyla (Merr.) A.P.Davis
 Psydrax lucidulus (Miq.) Mahyuni & K.M.Wong
 Psydrax lynesii Bullock ex Bridson
 Psydrax maingayi (Hook.f.) Bridson
 Psydrax manambyana (Cavaco) A.P.Davis & Bridson
 Psydrax manensis (Aubrév. & Pellegr.) Bridson
 Psydrax martini (Dunkley) Bridson
 Psydrax micans (Bullock) Bridson
 Psydrax moandensis Bridson
 Psydrax moggii Bridson
 Psydrax montana (Thwaites) Ridsdale
 Psydrax montigena S.T.Reynolds & R.J.F.Hend.
 Psydrax multiflorus Arriola & Alejandro
 Psydrax mutimushii Bridson
 Psydrax nitida (Craib) K.M.Wong
 Psydrax obovata (Klotzsch ex Eckl. & Zeyh.) Bridson
 Psydrax occidentalis (Cavaco) A.P.Davis & Bridson
 Psydrax odorata (G.Forst.) A.C.Sm. & S.P.Darwin
 Psydrax oleifolia (Hook.) S.T.Reynolds & R.J.F.Hend.
 Psydrax pallida S.T.Reynolds & R.J.F.Hend.
 Psydrax palma (K.Schum.) Bridson
 Psydrax paludosa S.T.Reynolds & R.J.F.Hend.
 Psydrax paradoxa (Virot) Mouly
 Psydrax parviflora (Afzel.) Bridson
 Psydrax pendulina S.T.Reynolds & R.J.F.Hend.
 Psydrax pergracilis (Bourd.) Ridsdale
 Psydrax polhillii Bridson
 Psydrax puberula  Arriola & Alejandro
 Psydrax recurvifolia (Bullock) Bridson
 Psydrax reticulata (C.T.White) S.T.Reynolds & R.J.F.Hend.
 Psydrax richardsiae Bridson
 Psydrax rigidula S.T.Reynolds & R.J.F.Hend.
 Psydrax robertsoniae Bridson
 Psydrax sabahensi Mahyuni
 Psydrax saligna S.T.Reynolds & R.J.F.Hend.
 Psydrax sambiranensis (Cavaco) A.P.Davis & Bridson
 Psydrax schimperiana (A.Rich.) Bridson
 Psydrax sepikensis A.P.Davis
 Psydrax shuguriensis Bridson
 Psydrax splendens (K.Schum.) Bridson
 Psydrax suaveolens (S.Moore) S.T.Reynolds & R.J.F.Hend.
 Psydrax subcordata (DC.) Bridson
 Psydrax suborbicularis (C.T.White) S.T.Reynolds & R.J.F.Hend.
 Psydrax sumatranus (Miq.) Mahyuni
 Psydrax tropica S.T.Reynolds & R.J.F.Hend.
 Psydrax umbellata (Wight) Bridson
 Psydrax undulatifolius K.M.Wong & Mahyuni
 Psydrax virgata (Hiern) Bridson
 Psydrax whitei Bridson
 Psydrax wongii Mahyuni

References

External links 
World Checklist of Rubiaceae
 Psydrax At: De Fructibus et Seminibus Plantarum At: Google Books
 De Fructibus et Seminibus Plantarum at Internet Archive
 Psydrax At: Plant Name Query At: IPNI
 CRC World Dictionary of Plant Names: M-Q At: Botany & Plant Science At: Life Science At: CRC Press
 Psydrax At:Index Nominum Genericorum At: References At: NMNH Department of Botany
 Psydrax At: List of Genera At: Rubiaceae At: List of families At: Families and Genera in GRIN At: Queries At: GRIN taxonomy for plants

 
Rubiaceae genera
Taxonomy articles created by Polbot